Prater may also refer to:

Places
The Wiener Prater, a large public park in Leopoldstadt, Vienna
The Wurstelprater, an amusement park within the Wiener Prater
Ernst-Happel-Stadion, a football stadium in Leopoldstadt, Vienna, known as the Prater Stadium (Praterstadion) from construction (1928) until 1992
Bohemian Prater (Böhmischer Prater), a small amusement park at the edge of Vienna
Prater, Virginia
Prater Island, an island in the Isar river in Munich

People
Dave Prater (1937–1988), American musician
Matt Prater (born 1984), American football player
Stanley Henry Prater (1890–1960), British naturalist

Other
Prater Violet, a book by Christopher Isherwood
Prater (film), a 1924 German silent film